Vesta Sarkhosh Curtis is the British Museum's Curator of Middle Eastern coins. She is Joint Director of the International Parthian Coin Project, The Sylloge Nummorum Parthicorum (SNP),  and Joint Editor of the SNP series.

Curtis was born in Tehran. She obtained her MA in Near Eastern Archaeology and Ancient Iranian Languages from the University of Göttingen and her PhD on Parthian art from University College London. In 1983-2003 Curtis was the Joint Editor of Iran: Journal of the British Institute of Persian Studies, in 1998-2003 Secretary of the British Institute of Persian Studies (BIPS), in 2006-2011 President of BIPS, and in 2005-2010 secretary of the Royal Numismatic Society. Curtis is a member of the Academic Committee of the Iran Heritage Foundation (IHF).

Curtis is the honorary director of the British Institute of Persian Studies. She is married to John Curtis, CEO of the Iran Heritage Foundation and the British Museum Keeper of Special Middle East Projects.

Curtis has taken part in expert panels on In Our Time four times.

Selected publications 
 Rivalling Rome. Parthian Coins and Culture, by Vesta Sarkhosh Curtis and Alexandra Magub (Spink, 2020). ISBN 9781912667444

References

External links 
 Who's Who, Coins Weekly
 Academia.edu
 British Museum staff page
 Worldcat

Year of birth missing (living people)
Living people
British curators
British women academics
Employees of the British Museum
People from Tehran
Iranologists
British people of Iranian descent
British numismatists
British art historians
University of Göttingen alumni
Alumni of University College London